The São Tomé spinetail (Zoonavena thomensis) is a species of swift in the family Apodidae. It is endemic to São Tomé and Príncipe.  The species was described by Ernst Hartert on 1900.

References

Zoonavena
Endemic birds of São Tomé and Príncipe
Birds described in 1900
Taxonomy articles created by Polbot